The 1994 Hall of Fame Bowl featured the 23rd-ranked Michigan Wolverines, and the unranked NC State Wolfpack. It was the eighth edition of the Hall of Fame Bowl.

After a scoreless first quarter, Michigan's Tyrone Wheatley scored on a 26-yard rushing touchdown, and Michigan led 7–0. Derrick Alexander returned a punt 79 yards for a touchdown, making it 14–0. Quarterback Todd Collins threw a 31-yard touchdown pass to Amani Toomer, making the score Michigan 21, NC State 0 at halftime.

In the third quarter, Michigan returned an interception 43 yards for a touchdown to lead 28–0. Tyrone Wheatley added an 18-yard touchdown run to make it 35–0. NC State got its only touchdown on a 12-yard touchdown pass, making it 35–7. Michigan closed the scoring with a 16-yard touchdown run by Powers, making the final score 42–7.

References

External links
 Summary at Bentley Historical Library, University of Michigan Athletics History

Hall of Fame Bowl
ReliaQuest Bowl
Michigan Wolverines football bowl games
NC State Wolfpack football bowl games
Hall of Fame Bowl
20th century in Tampa, Florida
January 1994 sports events in the United States
1994 in American sports